Carmen García González (1905 – May 13, 1979) was First Lady of Mexico and the wife of Emilio Portes Gil (1928-1930).

References

1905 births
1979 deaths
First ladies of Mexico
First ladies and gentlemen of Tamaulipas
People from General Terán, Nuevo León